Endotrichella is a genus of moths of the family Crambidae. It contains only one species, Endotrichella margaritifera, which is found in Papua New Guinea.

References

Pyraustinae
Crambidae genera